Igor Andreyevich Obukhov (born 29 May 1996) is a Russian football player. He plays for FC Neftekhimik Nizhnekamsk.

Club career
He made his professional debut in the Russian Professional Football League for FC Zenit-2 St. Petersburg on 8 November 2013 in a game against FC Dolgoprudny.

He made his Russian Premier League debut for FC Arsenal Tula in a game against PFC CSKA Moscow on 6 May 2018, in which he allowed 6 goals.

On 20 June 2019, he joined FC SKA-Khabarovsk.

On 28 January 2021, SKA-Khabarovsk announced that Obukhov will return to the Russian Premier League by moving to FC Rotor Volgograd.

International
He participated in the 2013 FIFA U-17 World Cup with Russia national under-17 football team.

Career statistics

Club

References

External links
 

1996 births
Footballers from Saint Petersburg
Living people
Russian footballers
Russia youth international footballers
Russia under-21 international footballers
Association football goalkeepers
FC Tyumen players
FC Arsenal Tula players
FC Zenit-2 Saint Petersburg players
FC SKA-Khabarovsk players
FC Zenit Saint Petersburg players
FC Rotor Volgograd players
FC Neftekhimik Nizhnekamsk players
Russian Premier League players
Russian First League players
Russian Second League players